CHLM-FM is a Canadian radio station, broadcasting at 90.7 FM in Rouyn-Noranda, Quebec. The station broadcasts the programming of the Ici Radio-Canada Première network.

History 
In 1976, then-owner Radio-Nord Communications was granted a license from the CRTC, in which the station would operate as Radio-Canada's private affiliate of what was then called "Première Chaîne"; also included was a rebroadcaster, CHLM-FM-1 at Lithium Mines, serving nearby Val-d'Or, operating on 97.3 MHz with effective radiated power of 52,000 watts. In 1979, CHLM-FM-1 was authorized to move to 103.5 MHz and to increase effective radiated power to 55,300 watts.

CHLM-FM and CHLM-FM-1 signed on the air by 1980; eventually, CHLM-FM-1's city of license would have changed to Amos, and broadcasting on another different frequency, 91.5 MHz.

On September 7, 1989, the station was denied a licence to add a transmitter at Ville-Marie, Quebec on 100.5 MHz. In 2002, the CBC would add a transmitter of their own serving Ville-Marie, CBFY-FM 89.1, rebroadcasting CHLM-FM.

In February 2000, CHLM-FM and CHLM-FM-1 became full-time re-broadcasters of the Radio-Canada network.

It was directly acquired by the CBC in 2004.

Programming 
The station's local programs are Des matins en or, and Région Zéro 8 in the afternoons. On public holidays, its local programs are replaced with local shows airing provincewide (Quebec) produced by different outlets in turn (except Montreal and Quebec City). The Saturday morning program, Samedi et rien d'autre, originates from CBF-FM Montreal.

Transmitters 

On October 17, 1986 the CRTC approved the CBC's application to change CBF-3's frequency from 1400 to 650 kHz.

On July 29, 2010, the CRTC approved the application to transfer transmitters CBF-1, CBF-3 and CBF-4 from CBF-FM Montreal to CHLM-FM.

On March 8, 2017, the CBC applied to convert CBF-1 710 to 95.9 MHz with the proposed callsign CBF-FM-1.

On March 9, 2017, the CBC applied to convert CBF-3 650 to 94.9 MHz with the proposed callsign CBF-FM-3. The CBC received approval to convert both CBF-1 Senneterre and CBF-3 Lebel-sur-Quévillon to the FM band on August 17, 2017.

On December 5, 2018, the CBC applied to convert CBF-4 to 97.7 MHz with the proposed callsign CBF-FM-4. The CRTC approved the CBC's application to convert CBF-4 to the FM band on February 15, 2019.

References

External links 
Ici Radio-Canada Première
 CHLM-FM history – Canadian Communications Foundation

Hlm
Hlm
Hlm
Radio stations established in 1976
1976 establishments in Quebec